Great Britain has been participating at the  Deaflympics since 1924 and has earned 249 medals.

Medal tallies

Summer Deaflympics

See also
United Kingdom at the Paralympics
United Kingdom at the Olympics

References

External links 
2017 Deaflympics 

Nations at the Deaflympics
D
Parasports in the United Kingdom
Deaf culture in the United Kingdom